Paolo Borghese may refer to:
Paolo Borghese (1622–1646), Italian nobleman, first husband of Olimpia Aldobrandini
Prince Paolo Borghese (1904–1985), Italian nobleman